Tyuleny Island (Russian: Тюлений) is an uninhabited island in the Caspian Sea. It is located 47 km east of the Dagestan coastline, in the Caspian Sea, near the entrance to the Kizlyar Gulf.

Geography
There is a weather station on it.

There are many Caspian seals in Tyuleny, hence its name, which means "seal" in Russian. Since parts of the islands are marshy, there are also many birds.

This island belongs to the Dagestan Republic, a federal subject of the Russian Federation.

Climate
Tyuleny Island has a cold desert climate (Köppen BWk).

Features

References

External links

Radio operators

Islands of Russia
Islands of the Caspian Sea
Landforms of Dagestan
Uninhabited islands of Russia